Implosions is the second album by composer Stephan Micus, released in 1977 through JAPO Records.

Reception

The AllMusic review by Michael P. Dawson simply states, "These pieces for various ethnic instruments are all played by Micus".

Track listing

Personnel
Dieter Bonhorst – design
Manfred Eicher – production
Stephan Micus – acoustic guitar, hammer dulcimer, khlui, rabab, shakuhachi, shō, sitar, vocals, zither
Dietmar Werle – photography
Martin Wieland – engineering

References

1977 albums
Albums produced by Manfred Eicher
JAPO Records albums
Stephan Micus albums